The World League Wrestling (WLW) Tag Team Championship, is a professional wrestling tag team championship created and promoted by the American independent professional wrestling promotion World League Wrestling.

Since the championship's creation in 2001, there have been 31 different teams that have held the title, combining for 36 total reigns.

Title history

Combined reigns

By team

References

External links
 WLW Tag Team Championship

Tag team wrestling championships
World League Wrestling championships